From the Other Side of the Century: A New American Poetry, 1960–1990 is a poetry anthology published in 1994. It was edited by American poet and publisher Douglas Messerli – under his own imprint  Sun & Moon Press – and includes poets from both the U.S. and Canada. 

It joined two other collections which appeared at that time: Paul Hoover's Postmodern American Poetry (Norton, 1994) and Eliot Weinberger's American Poetry Since 1950 (Marsilio, 1993). All three perhaps seeking to be for that time what Donald Allen's The New American Poetry (Grove Press, 1960) was for the 1960s. Publishers Weekly noted that "A strength of Messerli's book: he offers space enough to each poet, so that readers can trace developing poetic concerns, beginning with the Objectivists – the anthology's first poem is Charles Reznikoff's 'Children,' a Holocaust piece."

Messerli highlights 81 poets altogether and  organizes the anthology by dividing the poets into four thematic "gatherings":

 (1) cultural-mythic poets, including Louis Zukofsky, Charles Olson, Robert Duncan, and Allen Ginsberg
 (2) urban poets, including Barbara Guest, Frank O'Hara, John Ashbery, and Ted Berrigan
 (3) language poets, including Robert Creeley and Charles Bernstein
 (4) performance poets, including John Cage and Jerome Rothenberg

Poets included in From the Other Side of the Century anthology

 Charles Reznikoff 
 Lorine Niedecker 
 Carl Rakosi 
 Louis Zukofsky 
 George Oppen 
 Charles Olson 
 Robert Duncan 
 Robin Blaser 
 Jack Spicer 
 Allen Ginsberg 
 Larry Eigner 
 Gilbert Sorrentino 
 John Wieners 
 Robert Kelly 
 Ronald Johnson 
 Rosmarie Waldrop 
 Kenneth Irby 
 Clarence Major 
 Susan Howe 
 Fanny Howe 
 bpNichol 
 Aaron Shurin 
 Dennis Phillips 
 Christopher Dewdney 
 Barbara Guest 
 James Schuyler 
 Frank O'Hara 
 John Ashbery 
 Joseph Ceravolo 
 Ted Berrigan 
 Charles North 
 Ron Padgett 
 Michael Brownstein 
 Lewis Warsh 
 Lorenzo Thomas 
 Marjorie Welish 
 John Godfrey 
 Alice Notley 
 Diane Ward 
 Robert Creeley 
 Hannah Weiner 
 David Bromige 
 Clark Coolidge 
 Lyn Hejinian 
 Robert Grenier 
 Ted Greenwald 
 Nick Piombino 
 Ray DiPalma 
 Michael Palmer 
 Michael Davidson 
 Bernadette Mayer 
 James Sherry 
 Ron Silliman 
 Rae Armantrout 
 Bob Perelman 
 Barrett Watten 
 Kit Robinson 
 Charles Bernstein 
 Alan Davies 
 Jean Day 
 John Cage 
 Jackson Mac Low 
 Kenward Elmslie 
 Jerome Rothenberg 
 David Antin 
 Amiri Baraka/Leroi Jones 
 Joan Retallack 
 John Taggart 
 Nicole Brossard 
 Mac Wellman 
 Douglas Messerli 
 Peter Inman 
 Steve McCaffery 
 Nathaniel Mackey 
 Leslie Scalapino 
 Bruce Andrews 
 Steve Benson 
 Abigail Child 
 Tina Darragh 
 Fiona Templeton 
 Carla Harryman

See also
 1994 in poetry
 1994 in literature
 American poetry
 Canadian poetry
 List of poetry anthologies

References

External links
Whose New American Poetry?: Anthologizing in the Nineties article by Marjorie Perloff

1994 poetry books
1994 anthologies
American poetry anthologies
20th-century American literature